Tseng Ming-chung or William Tseng (born 22 January 1959) is a Taiwanese politician. He has served as Deputy Minister of Finance, chaired the Financial Supervisory Commission, and as an elected member of the Legislative Yuan.

Education
Tseng obtained his doctoral degree in business administration from National Taipei University.

Political career
As deputy minister of finance, Tseng commented on the amendment to raise the tax and health and welfare surcharge on tobacco in early May 2013. He stated that the move would result in a loss of NT$610 million in tax revenue but it will bring in an extra NT$25 billion in income used for health and welfare funds.

He was named the Chairperson of the Financial Supervisory Commission of the Executive Yuan on 1 August 2013.

Tseng was elected to the Legislative Yuan through the proportional representation ballot in 2016, as a member of the Kuomintang. Prior to the election, he was an independent.

References

Taiwanese Ministers of Finance
Living people
1959 births
Party List Members of the Legislative Yuan
Members of the 9th Legislative Yuan
Kuomintang Members of the Legislative Yuan in Taiwan